Blizz Uganda is a Ugandan news website founded in 2015. Owned by "Blizz Entertainment Limited", the website provides entertainment, national and sports news mainly from Uganda and the East African Community.

History 
Blizz Uganda was launched in 2015  and is headquartered in Kampala, Uganda the capital and largest city in the country.

Blizz Uganda launched as an Entertainment Website but later increased the scope to cover National, Sports, Business and Political News.

The company was incorporated in 2016 as Blizz Entertainment Limited.

In 2017, the company changed the domain from ugblizz.com to blizz.co.ug and in that year received Accreditation from  Uganda Communications Commission (UCC) the regulator of digital communications licensed as an online news publisher.

In 2021, Blizz Uganda launched a Business news website with a directory  and job portal The Pearl Post.

Overview 
Blizz Uganda is a registered media company licensed as an online website.

The website covers fields of Entertainment, Politics and Sports news in addition to music streaming and downloading. The website mostly covers local news from Uganda.

Reception 
Blizz Uganda upon its launch become one of the most visited websites in the country. In 2021,May, it was listed as Number 10 in the list of most visited websites in the country.

The website says that they receive over 1,700,000 pages every month  which makes them one of the most visited websites in the 3rd largest economy in the East African community.

See also
 List of newspapers in Uganda
 Media in Uganda

References 

Blizz Uganda
2015 establishments in Uganda
Magazines established in 2007